Northern Natural Gas (NNG) is a natural gas pipeline which brings gas from the Permian Basin in Texas to the Chicago area, Wisconsin, Minnesota and the Upper Peninsula of Michigan.  It is owned by MidAmerican Energy Holdings Company.  Its FERC code is 59.

External links
Pipeline Electronic Bulletin Board

Natural gas pipelines in the United States
Natural gas pipelines in Texas
Natural gas pipelines in Illinois
Natural gas pipelines in Wisconsin
Natural gas pipelines in Minnesota
Natural gas pipelines in Michigan